"Saving Forever for You" is a song performed by American singer Shanice and written by Diane Warren. It was one of the singles released from the Beverly Hills 90210 soundtrack and became Shanice's second and final single, peaking at number four. However, it does not appear on Ultimate Collection. A music video was filmed and features Brian Austin Green from Beverly Hills, 90210.

Critical reception
Larry Flick from Billboard wrote, "If you're hankering for fresh material from this highly talented pop/urban ingenue, look no further. This tune from the soundtrack to Fox-TV's "Beverly Hills 90210" is a sugary ballad that is given depth by Shanice's sincere delivery. While she would be better served by an arrangement that has a little less gloss, any chance to feast on her voice is well worth taking."

Charts

Weekly charts

Year-end charts

Release history

References

1992 songs
1992 singles
1990s ballads
Giant Records (Warner) singles
Pop ballads
Reprise Records singles
Shanice songs
Song recordings produced by David Foster
Songs written by Diane Warren